Steven Edward Conway (born October 5, 1944) is an American politician serving as a member of the Washington State Senate. He was first elected to the senate in 2010 after the retirement of Rosa Franklin, and previously represented District 29 of the Washington House of Representatives for 18 years.

References

1944 births
Living people
Democratic Party Washington (state) state senators
University of Oregon alumni
University of Portland alumni
Democratic Party members of the Washington House of Representatives
People from Ontario, Oregon
Politicians from Tacoma, Washington
21st-century American politicians